The Netherlands competed at the 1980 Summer Olympics in Moscow, USSR. In partial support of the American-led boycott of the 1980 Summer Olympics in protest over the Soviet Union's invasion of Afghanistan, the Dutch athletes boycotted the Opening Ceremony, and the Olympic Flag was used in place of Netherlands' national flag at medal ceremonies. 75 competitors, 57 men and 18 women, took part in 56 events in 10 sports.

Medalists

Silver
Gerard Nijboer — Athletics, Men's Marathon

Bronze
Henk Numan — Judo, Men's Half-Heavyweight (95 kg) 
Conny van Bentum, Reggie de Jong, Annelies Maas and Wilma van Velsen — Swimming, Women's 4 × 100 m Freestyle Relay

Archery

The first appearance by Dutch archers in the Olympics resulted in top eight finishes for both competitors.

Women's Individual Competition:
Catherina Floris — 2382 points (→ 6th place)

Men's Individual Competition:
Martinus Reniers — 2418 points (→ 8th place)

Athletics

Men's 100 metres
 Mario Westbroek
 Heat — 10.91 (→ did not advance)

Men's 200 metres
 Henk Brouwer
 Heat — 21.96 (→ did not advance)

Men's 10,000 metres
 Gerard Tebroke
 Heat — 29:05.0 (→ did not advance)

Men's Marathon
 Gerard Nijboer
 Final — 2:11:20 (→  Silver Medal)

 Cor Vriend
 Final — 2:26:41 (→ 41st place)

Men's 4x400 metres Relay
 Henk Brouwer, Mario Westbroek, Marcel Klarenbeek, and Harry Schulting
 Heat — 3:06.0 (→ did not advance)

Men's 400 m Hurdles
 Harry Schulting
 Heat — 50.01
 Semifinals — 50.61 (→ did not advance)

Women's 100 metres
 Els Vader
 Heat — 11.61
 Quarterfinals — did not finish (→ did not advance)

Women's Pentathlon
 Sylvia Barlag — 4333 points (→ 10th place)
 100 metres — 14.20s
 Shot Put — 11.82m 
 High Jump — 1.80m 
 Long Jump — 6.05m 
 800 metres — 2:16.40

Canoeing

Cycling

Seven cyclists represented the Netherlands in 1980.

Individual road race
 Adri van der Poel
 Jacques Hanegraaf
 Peter Winnen
 Jacques van Meer

Team time trial
 Guus Bierings
 Jacques Hanegraaf
 Theo Hogervorst
 Adri van der Poel

Sprint
 Lau Veldt

Judo

Rowing

Sailing

Shooting

Swimming

Men's 100 m Freestyle
Cees Vervoorn
 Heats — 52,57
 Semi-Finals — 52,73 (→ did not advance)

Men's 200 m Freestyle
Peter Drost
 Heats — 1.55,41 (→ did not advance)
Cees Jan Winkel
 Heats — 1.56,48(→ did not advance)

Men's 100 m Butterfly
Cees Vervoorn
 Heats — 55,76
 Semi-Finals — 55,02
 Final — 55,25 (→ 4th place)

Men's 200 m Butterfly
Cees Vervoorn
 Heats — 2.02,21
 Final — 2.02,52 (→ 6th place)

Men's 100 m Breaststroke
Albert Boonstra
 Heats — 1.06,47 (→ did not advance)

Men's 200 m Breaststroke
Albert Boonstra
 Heats — 2.27,21 (→ did not advance)

Men's 100 m Backstroke
Fred Eefting
 Heats — 58,59
 Semi-Finals — 57,91
 Final — 57,95 (→ 6th place)

Men's 200 m Backstroke
Fred Eefting
 Heats — 2.04,78
 Final — 2.03,92 (→ 5th place)

Men's 4 × 200 m Freestyle Relay
Cees Vervoorn, Peter Drost, Cees Jan Winkel, and Fred Eefting
 Heats — 7.42,85 (→ did not advance)

Men's 4 × 100 m Medley Relay
Fred Eefting, Albert Boonstra, Cees Vervoorn, and Cees Jan Winkel
 Heats — 3.52,33
 Final — 3.51,81 (→ 7th place)

Women's 100 m Freestyle
Conny van Bentum
 Heats — 57,51
 Final — 57,63 (→ 5th place)
Monique Drost
 Heats — DSQ

Women's 200 m Freestyle
Reggie de Jong
 Heats — 2.02,66
 Final — 2.02,76 (→ 5th place)
Annelies Maas
 Heats — 2.04,07 (→ did not advance)

Women's 400 m Freestyle
Reggie de Jong
 Heats — 4.15,07
 Final — 4.15,98 (→ 7th place)
Annelies Maas
 Heats — 4.13,12
 Final — 4.15,79 (→ 6th place)

Women's 800 m Freestyle
Reggie de Jong
 Heats — 8.54,49 (→ did not advance)

Women's 100 m Butterfly
Wilma van Velsen
 Heats — 1.03,31 (→ did not advance)

Women's 200 m Butterfly
Wilma van Velsen
 Heats — 2.21,81 (→ did not advance)

Women's 100 m Backstroke
Monique Bosga
 Heats — 1.04,36
 Final — 1.04,47 (→ 7th place)
Jolanda de Rover
 Heats — 1.04,79 (→ did not advance)

Women's 200 m Backstroke
Monique Bosga
 Heats — 2.19,21 (→ did not advance)
Jolanda de Rover
 Heats — 2.17,12 (→ did not advance)

Women's 4 × 100 m Freestyle Relay
Conny van Bentum, Wilma van Velsen, Reggie de Jong, and Annelies Maas
 Heats — 3.51,30
 Final — 3.49,51 (→ Bronze Medal)

Water polo

Men's Team Competition
Preliminary Round (Group A)
 Defeated Greece (8-7)
 Lost to Hungary (3-5)
 Defeated Romania (5-3)
Final Round (Group A)
 Lost to Spain (5-6)
 Drew with Cuba (7-7)
 Lost to Yugoslavia (4-5)
 Lost to Soviet Union (3-7)
 Lost to Hungary (7-8) → 6th place

Team Roster
 Stan van Belkum
 Wouly de Bie
 Ton Buunk 
 Jan Jaap Korevaar
 Nico Landeweerd 
 Aad van Mil 
 Ruud Misdorp 
 Dick Nieuwenhuizen 
 Eric Noordegraaf 
 Jan Evert Veer 
 Hans van Zeeland

References

Nations at the 1980 Summer Olympics
1980
S